The Prix Anne-Hébert is a Canadian literary award, presented annually to the best first work of fiction in French by a writer from Quebec. The award was created in 2000 to honour writer Anne Hébert following her death.

The award has a monetary value of $7,500. It is sponsored by the Centre culturel canadien à Paris and Société Radio-Canada.

Winners
 2001 - Maryse Barbance, Toxiques
 2002 - Denis Thériault, L'Iguane
 2003 - Marie-Hélène Poitras, Soudain le Minotaure
 2004 - Hélène Dorion, Jours de sable
 2005 - Gilles Jobidon, La Route des petits matins
 2006 - Nicolas Dickner, Nikolski
 2007 - Mélanie Vincelette, Crimes horticoles
 2008 - Anne Rose Gorroz  L'homme Ligote" Michèle Plomer, (mention spéciale du jury) Jardin sablier''

French-language literature in Canada
Quebec awards
Awards established in 2000
2000 establishments in Canada
Canadian fiction awards
French-language literary awards